The Bridge Between is the second EP by American metalcore band Phinehas. The EP features re-recorded versions of songs from their debut self-titled EP, acoustic renditions of songs from the debut studio album Thegodmachine and new tracks "David and the Gate" and "Enkindler". It was released January 22, 2013, through Red Cord Records and was produced by the band themselves.

Track listing

Personnel
Phinehas
 Sean McCulloch – lead vocals
 Jason Combs – guitars
 Bryce Kelley – bass, backing vocals
 Lee Humerian – drums, backing vocals, piano on track 4

Additional musicians
 Ann Marie Flathers – guest vocals and piano on track 7

Additional personnel
 Phinehas – production
 Jeff Darcy – engineering, mixing, mastering
 Trent Tieso – artwork

References

2013 EPs
Phinehas (band) albums